Cousin Kate is a lost 1921 American drama film produced and released by the Vitagraph Company of America. It is based on a 1903 play by Hubert Henry Davies. On the Broadway stage Ethel Barrymore made the role of Kate Curtis her own and was identified with it for many years. This film version was directed by a relative of Barrymore's, Lucille McVey, who was the second wife of Barrymore's uncle Sidney Drew. Alice Joyce stars in this film version.

Cast
Alice Joyce as Kate Curtis
Gilbert Emery as Heath Desmond
Beth Martin as Amy Spencer
Inez Shannon as Mrs. Spencer
Leslie Austin as Reverend James Bartlett
Freddie Verdi as Bobby
Frances Miller as Jane (billed as Frances Miller Grant)
Henry Hallam as Bishop

References

External links

Coming attractions lantern slide to the film

1921 films
1921 drama films
Silent American drama films
American silent feature films
American films based on plays
Lost American films
Vitagraph Studios films
American black-and-white films
Films with screenplays by Lillian Case Russell
1921 lost films
Lost drama films
1920s American films